Streptocarpus ionanthus (synonym Saintpaulia ionantha) is a species of Streptocarpus in the section Saintpaulia, commonly known as an African violet. It is native to eastern and southwestern Tanzania.

Infraspecific taxa

, Plants of the World Online accepted the following subspecies and varieties. Many have previously been treated as separate species in the no longer recognized genus Saintpaulia.
Streptocarpus ionanthus var. diplotrichus (B.L.Burtt) Christenh. (syn. Saintpaulia diplotricha)
Streptocarpus ionanthus subsp. grandifolius (B.L.Burtt) Christenh. (syn. Saintpaulia grandifolia)
Streptocarpus ionanthus subsp. grotei (Engl.) Christenh. (syn. Saintpaulia amaniensis, Saintpaulia confusa, Saintpaulia difficilis, Saintpaulia grotei, Saintpaulia magungensis)
Streptocarpus ionanthus subsp. mafiensis (I.Darbysh. & Pócs) Christenh.
Streptocarpus ionanthus subsp. occidentalis (B.L.Burtt) Christenh.
Streptocarpus ionanthus subsp. orbicularis (B.L.Burtt) Christenh. (syn. Saintpaulia orbicularis)
Streptocarpus ionanthus subsp. pendulus (B.L.Burtt) Christenh. (syn. Saintpaulia intermedia, Saintpaulia pendula)
Streptocarpus ionanthus subsp. rupicola (B.L.Burtt) Christenh. (syn. Saintpaulia rupicola)
Streptocarpus ionanthus subsp. velutinus (B.L.Burtt) Christenh. (syn. Saintpaulia velutina)

References

ionanthus
House plants
Endemic flora of Tanzania
Taxa named by Hermann Wendland
Plants described in 1893